Ceremonial Stone Landscapes is the term used by USET, United Southern and Eastern Tribes, Inc., a nonprofit, intertribal organization of American Indians, for certain stonework sites in eastern North America. Elements often found at these sites include dry stone walls, rock piles (sometimes referred to as cairns), stone chambers, unusually-shaped boulders, split boulders with stones inserted in the split, and boulders propped up off the ground with smaller rocks. While neither the age of these sites nor the idea of their creation by indigenous peoples has been accepted generally, interest in the sites is increasing. This interest is generated in part by USET's Resolution #2007:037, entitled Sacred Ceremonial Stone Landscapes Found in the Ancestral Territories of United Southern and Eastern Tribes, Inc. Member Tribes.

Sections of the USET resolution describing these sites read as follows:

"within the ancestral territories of the USET Tribes there exist sacred ceremonial stone landscapes and their stone structures which are of particular cultural value to certain member Tribes;"

"for thousands of years before the immigration of Europeans, the medicine people of the USET Tribal ancestors used these sacred landscapes to sustain the people's reliance on Mother Earth and the spirit energies of balance and harmony"

"whether these stone structures are massive or small structures, stacked, stone rows, or effigies, these prayers in stone are often mistaken by archaeologists and State Historic Preservation Officers (SHPOs) as the efforts of farmers clearing stones for agricultural or wall building purposes"

The resolution goes on to request that the federal government work to understand and preserve the stone landscapes.

Notes 

Archaeology of the Americas
Pre-Columbian art
Rock art in North America
Pre-Columbian cultures